{{Taxobox
| image = Dendronotus robustus (YPM IZ 010498.GP).jpeg
| image_caption = 
| regnum = Animalia
| phylum = Mollusca
| classis = Gastropoda
| unranked_superfamilia = clade Heterobranchia
clade Euthyneura
clade Nudipleura
clade Nudibranchia
clade Dexiarchia
clade Cladobranchia
clade Dendronotida
| superfamilia = Tritonioidea
| familia = Dendronotidae
| subfamilia = 
| genus = Dendronotus
| species = D. robustus
| binomial = Dendronotus robustus
| binomial_authority = A. E. Verrill, 1870<ref>Verrill A.E. (1870). [https://www.biodiversitylibrary.org/page/36444620  Contributions to zoology from the museum of Yale College. Nº 8.– Descriptions of some New England Nudibranchiata.] American Journal of Science and Arts, (2) 50: 405-408, page(s): 405-406</ref>
| synonyms = 
}}Dendronotus robustus is a species of sea slug, a dendronotid nudibranch, a shell-less marine gastropod mollusc in the family Dendronotidae.
 
 Distribution 
This species was described from Whale Cove, Grand Menan,  on the Atlantic Ocean coast of North America. It is an Arctic species which also occurs in Svalbard and northern Norway.

DescriptionDendronotus robustus is a large dendronotid nudibranch, growing to at least 150 mm in length. The body is translucent red-brown. There are opaque white spots on the sides and back of the body, velar processes and rhinophore sheaths. The body shape is similar to Dendronotus albopunctatus'', with a broad foot.

References

Dendronotidae
Gastropods described in 1870